Fort Myers (or Ft. Myers) is a city in and the county seat and commercial center of Lee County, Florida, United States. The Census Bureau's Population Estimates Program calculated that the city's population was 92,245 in 2021, ranking the city the 370th-most-populous in the country. Together with the larger and more residential city of Cape Coral, the smaller cities of Fort Myers Beach, Sanibel, and Bonita Springs, the village of Estero, and the unincorporated districts of Lehigh Acres and North Fort Myers, it anchors a metropolitan statistical area (MSA) which comprises Lee County and has a population of 787,976 as of 2021.

Fort Myers is a gateway to the Southwest Florida region and a major tourist destination within Florida. The winter estates of Thomas Edison ("Seminole Lodge") and Henry Ford ("The Mangoes") are major attractions. The city takes its name from a local former fort that was built during the Seminole Wars. The fort in turn took its name from Colonel Abraham Myers in 1850; Myers served in the United States Army, mostly the Quartermaster Department, in various posts from 1833-1861 and was the quartermaster general of the Confederate States Army from 1861–1864.

History
According to some historians, the Calusa capital was located near Fort Myers. Following European contact, Spain had colonial influence in Florida, succeeded by Great Britain and lastly the United States.

Seminole Wars

During the Second Seminole War, between 1835 and 1842, the U.S. Army operated Fort Dulaney at Punta Rassa, at the mouth of the Caloosahatchee River. When a hurricane destroyed Fort Dulaney in October 1841, army operations were moved up the Caloosahatchee River to a site named Fort Harvie. Fort Harvie was abandoned in 1842, as the Second Seminole War wound down. After a white trader was killed by Seminoles on the Peace River in 1849, the Army returned to the Caloosahatchee River in 1850. Major David E. Twiggs, then stationed at Fort Brooke (present day-Tampa), gave orders for two companies of artillery to "select a suitable place for the establishment of a post and immediately throw up such light works as may secure [their] stores, and remove from the Indians any temptation to which [their] isolated position may give rise." The new Fort Myers was built on the burned ruins of Fort Harvie. 

The fort was named for Brevet Colonel Abraham Charles Myers, quartermaster for the Army's Department of Florida and future son-in-law of Major Twiggs. Irvin Solomon notes that Fort Myers was described "as 'one of the finest and largest' forts of the Seminole Wars". It was abandoned in 1858, at the end of the Third Seminole War.

Civil War
During the American Civil War, Confederate blockade runners and cattle ranchers were based in Fort Myers. These settlers prospered through trading with the Seminole and Union soldiers.

The United States Army set up a camp on Useppa Island, near the entrance to Charlotte Harbor, in December 1863. It was intended as a place from which to recruit Union sympathizers and Confederate deserters and conscription-evaders and to raid into the interior and interfere with Confederate efforts to round up cattle for supply to the Confederate Army. After some probes along the Peace and Myakka rivers, which had mixed results, operations were moved to the mainland. Troops from the 47th Pennsylvania Infantry Regiment and the 2nd Regiment of Florida Rangers (later reorganized as the 2nd Florida Cavalry Regiment) left Key West for Fort Myers early in January 1864. The Union soldiers reached Fort Myers quickly enough to capture three Confederate sympathizers before they could act on orders to burn the fort to keep it out of Union hands. Beyond the principal cause for occupying the fort of providing support for Union sympathizers and local residents disaffected with Confederate taxation and conscription, the fort provided access to the large cattle herds in southern Florida, support for the blockade of the southwest Florida coast being conducted by the U.S. Navy, and a haven for any escaped slaves in the area.

In April 1864, after the troops from the 47th Pennsylvania Infantry Regiment had been transferred to Louisiana, Companies D and I of the 2nd United States Colored Infantry Regiment were transferred from Key West to Fort Myers, and remained at the fort until it was abandoned. Company G of the regiment had also been sent to Fort Myers by early May.  Solomon argues that Brevet Brigadier General Daniel Phineas Woodbury, commandant of the District of Key West and the Tortugas, intended that action to be an irritant to the Confederacy. The presence of the black soldiers, who made up the majority of troops used in raids into Confederate territory, played on Confederate fears of armed blacks. It was reported that Woodbury took pleasure in placing a "prickly pear cactus under the Confederate saddle".

The Seminole War-era blockhouse had been repaired and another two-story blockhouse built. The fort was soon harboring more than 400 civilians and Confederate army deserters. Many of the white men enlisted in the 2nd Florida Union Cavalry. Although designated as cavalry, the members of the regiment stationed at Fort Myers were never mounted. Escaped slaves that came to the fort were recruited into the 2nd United States Colored Infantry Regiment.

The Union achieved control of the full length of the Mississippi River after the fall of Vicksburg in July 1863. The Confederate Army then became dependent on Florida for most of its supply of beef. By the end of 1863 between 1,000 and 2,000 head of cattle were being shipped to the Confederate Army from Florida every week. 

As 1864 progressed, Union troops and sympathizers began driving cattle to Punta Rassa to supply Union ships on blockade duty and Union-held Key West, reducing the supply of cattle available to Confederate forces. The increased shipping from Punta Rassa led the Union Army to built a barracks and a wharf there. By one Confederate estimate, the Union shipped 4,500 head of cattle from Punta Rassa.

The Battle of Fort Myers was fought on February 20, 1865, in Lee County, Florida, during the last months of the American Civil War. This small engagement is known as the "southernmost land battle of the Civil War." However, see Battle of Palmito Ranch.

Settlement and founding
The Fort Myers community was founded after the American Civil War by Captain Manuel A. Gonzalez on February 21, 1866. Captain Gonzalez was familiar with the area as a result of his years of service delivering mail and supplies to the Union Army at the fort during the Seminole Indian Wars and Civil War. When the U.S. government abandoned the fort following the Civil War, Gonzalez sailed from Key West to found the community. Three weeks later, Joseph Vivas and his wife, Christianna Stirrup Vivas, arrived with Gonzalez's wife, Evalina, and daughter Mary.

Gonzalez settled his family near the abandoned Fort Myers, where he began the area's first trading post. He traded tobacco, beads, and gunpowder, and sold otter, bobcat, and gator hide to the neighboring Seminole. A small community began to form around the trading post.

In the late 19th century, northerners began to travel to Florida in the winter. Some saw development opportunities. In 1881, the wealthy industrialist Hamilton Disston of Philadelphia, Pennsylvania, came to the Caloosahatchee Valley. He planned to dredge and drain the Everglades for development. Diston connected Lake Okeechobee with the Caloosahatchee River; this allowed steamboats to run from the Gulf of Mexico to Lake Okeechobee and up the Kissimmee River.

On August 12, 1885, the small town of Fort Myers—all 349 residents—was incorporated. At that time, it was the second-largest town on Florida's Gulf Coast south of Cedar Key.

In 1885, inventor Thomas Alva Edison was cruising Florida's west coast and stopped to visit Fort Myers. He soon bought 13 acres along the Caloosahatchee River in town. There he built his home "Seminole Lodge", as a winter retreat. It included a laboratory for his continuing work. After the lodge was completed in 1886, Edison and his wife, Mina, spent many winters in Fort Myers. Edison also enjoyed local recreational fishing, for which Fort Myers had gained a national reputation.

Despite an initial offer by Edison to light the town, on New Year's Day in 1898 Fort Myers was first electrified by the Seminole Canning Company, a local company that canned and preserved fruit.

In 1898, the Royal Palm Hotel was constructed. This luxury hotel attracted tourists and established Fort Myers nationally as a winter resort destination.

20th century
On May 10, 1904, access to the Fort Myers area was greatly improved with the opening of the Atlantic Coast Line Railroad, connecting Punta Gorda to Fort Myers. This route provided Lee County both passenger and freight railroad service. The arrival of the railroad, however, also led to greater segregation in Fort Myers. With the railroad came the need for more unskilled labor and the arrival of a more uneducated workforce, compared to many African Americans who had already resided in town, some of whom had been tradespersons, vendors, and landowners. These more middle-class black citizens, as well as the new African-American laborers,  were increasingly pressured to move to the segregated area that would become known as Safety Hill. This area of town, as can be seen by contemporary photographs, had a lower quality of houses and street surfaces. The area, now known as Dunbar, is still highly segregated from the rest of Fort Myers. 

In 1907, the Seminole tribes' Federal Agency headquarters was relocated to Fort Myers. It remained there until 1913. 

In 1908, the Arcade Theater was constructed in Downtown Fort Myers. Originally a vaudeville house, Edison viewed films here for the first time with friends Henry Ford and Harvey Firestone. With the growth of the film industry, the Arcade Theatre was converted into a full movie house. A wall divided the stage in order to form two screening rooms. Changes in moviegoing habits since the late 20th century have led to the renovation of the theater for use again in live performance. It is now host to the Florida Repertory Theatre, a performing arts hall.

During World War I, Edison became concerned about America's reliance on foreign supplies of rubber. He partnered with tire producer Harvey Firestone (of the Firestone Tire and Rubber Company) and Henry Ford (of the Ford Motor Company) to try to find a rubber tree or plant that could grow quickly in the United States. He sought one that would contain enough latex to support his research endeavor. In 1927, the three men contributed $25,000 each, and created the Edison Botanic Research Corporation in an attempt to find a solution to this problem. In 1928, the Edison Botanic Research Corporation laboratory was constructed. It was in Fort Myers that Edison conducted the majority of his research and planted exotic plants and trees. He sent results and sample rubber  residues to West Orange, New Jersey, for further work at his large Thomas A. Edison "Invention Factory" (now preserved in the Thomas Edison National Historical Park). Through Edison's efforts, the royal palms lining Riverside Avenue (now McGregor Boulevard) were imported and planted. They inspired Fort Myers' nickname as "City of Palms".

After testing around 17,000 plant samples, Edison eventually discovered a source in the goldenrod plant (Solidago leavenworthii). The rubber project was transferred to the United States Department of Agriculture five years later.

In 1916, automobile magnate Ford purchased the home next to Edison's from Robert Smith of New York. Ford named his estate "the Mangoes". Ford's craftsman-style "bungalow" was built in 1911 by Smith. Ford, Firestone, and Edison were leaders in American industry and part of an exclusive group titled "the Millionaires' Club". The three men have been memorialized in statues in downtown Fort Myers' Centennial Park.

In 1924, with the beginning of construction of the Edison Bridge, named for Edison, the city's population steadily grew. The bridge was opened on February 11, 1931, the 84th birthday of its namesake. Edison dedicated the bridge, and was the first to drive across it.

In the decade following the bridge's construction, the city had a real estate boom. Several new residential subdivisions were built beyond downtown, including Dean Park, Edison Park, and Seminole Park. Edison Park, located across McGregor Boulevard from the Edison and Ford properties, includes a number of Fort Myers' most stately homes. The population of Fort Myers City had been 575 citizens in 1890. By 1930, it had climbed to 9,082. 

In 1947, Mina Edison deeded Seminole Lodge to the city of Fort Myers, in memory of her late husband and for the enjoyment of the public. By 1988, the adjacent Henry Ford winter estate was purchased by the city and opened for public tours in 1990. The combined properties today are known as the Edison and Ford Winter Estates.

Hurricane Ian 
Fort Myers suffered catastrophic damage from Hurricane Ian on September 28, 2022.

Geography and climate

Fort Myers has a tropical savanna climate (Aw).

Rainfall averages just over 57 inches per year, strongly concentrated during the rainy season (June to September) with its frequent showers and thunderstorms; on average, these four months deliver 67 percent of annual rainfall. From October to May, average monthly rainfall is less than four inches. In years with drier than average conditions from winter into mid-spring, drought can develop, and brush fires can be a significant threat. Reflecting the June to September wet season, Fort Myers has 89 days annually in which a thunderstorm is close enough for thunder to be heard, the most in the nation.

Demographics

The population of Fort Myers was 62,298 at the 2010 census. Between the 2000 census and 2010 census, the city's population increased at a rate of 29.2 percent.

Fort Myers is one of two cities that make up the Cape Coral-Fort Myers Metropolitan Statistical Area. The 2010 population for the metropolitan area was 618,754.

The population of Lee County, Florida and the Cape Coral-Fort Myers Metropolitan Statistical Area has grown 40.3 percent since the census in 2000, much faster than the average growth rate of 17.6 percent experienced throughout the State of Florida.

Government
Fort Myers has a council–manager government in which the city council consists of a mayor and six council members. The city council is responsible for establishing policy, passing local ordinances, voting appropriations, and developing an overall vision for the city. The mayor is elected by registered voters city-wide. The mayor of Fort Myers is Kevin B. Anderson. Council members are elected by registered voters in their ward and represent that particular ward for a four-year term. Council members must continue to reside in that particular ward.

Policing of Fort Myers is performed by the Fort Myers Police Department.

Education

Secondary schools

See: Lee County School District for other public schools in the area.
Secondary schools in the city include:
 Dunbar High School 
 Fort Myers Senior High School, an International Baccalaureate school
 Bishop Verot High School, a private, Roman Catholic high school in Fort Myers, operated by the Diocese of Venice, Florida

Higher education

Institutions of higher learning in the city include:
 Hodges University
 Keiser University
 Nova Southeastern University
 Rasmussen College
 Southern Technical College
Fort Myers Technical College

Libraries 

Library Services include:
 Fort Myers Regional Library: The Fort Myers Regional Library is the hub for the Lee County Library System, holding the main collections of legal, business, news, and financial information. The library is located in downtown Fort Myers.
 Dunbar-Jupiter Hammon Public Library: The library opened on October 7, 1974. The founders named the library in honor of the first African poet to have his work published. Dunbar, the community's name, was added at the request of its residents. The library was moved in 1996 to its current location on Blount Street. It is home to the largest African-American book collection in southwest Florida.

Sports
The City of Palms Classic is an annual high school basketball tournament held in Fort Myers since 1973. By 2015, 120 players that had participated in the tournament had been named McDonald's All-Americans and 94 had been drafted into the NBA.

The Florida Eels is a Tier III junior hockey program in the USPHL with two teams; one in the Premier Division and one in the Elite Division. Both teams have performed well in their regular season and playoffs, advancing to Nationals on multiple occasions. The Fort Myers Skatium is their home rink.

Points of interest

 The  Calusa Nature Center and Planetarium is a private, not-for-profit, environmental education organization. Set on a  site, it has a museum, three nature trails, a planetarium, butterfly and bird aviaries, a gift shop and meeting and picnic areas.
 City of Palms Park, former home of the Boston Red Sox spring training program, close to downtown Fort Myers
 Edison and Ford Winter Estates
 Edison Mall
 Historic Downtown, waterfront entertainment district
 Murphy-Burroughs House
 Imaginarium Science Center
 Southwest Florida Museum of History

Public transportation

Airports
The Fort Myers metropolitan area is served by two nearby airports. Southwest Florida International Airport (RSW) is located southeast of the city. The airport, which sits on 13,555 acres of land, is the 45th busiest airport in the United States (by annual passengers). In 2018 the airport served 9,373,178 passengers. Page Field is a small general aviation airport whose primary traffic consist of smaller aircraft.

Ground transport
Busses run by LeeTran provide local service in Fort Myers.

Fort Myers in popular culture

In film
 The abandoned city scene with the Edison Theatre, from the movie Day of the Dead (1985) was filmed in downtown Fort Myers.
 Some courthouse and other "city" scenes in Just Cause (1995) were filmed in downtown Ft. Myers.
 Part of the independent film Trans (1999) was filmed in Fort Myers.

In print
 Fort Myers is part of the setting of Red Grass River: A Legend (1998), a novel by James Carlos Blake.

Notable people

Present

 Nate Allen, safety for Miami Dolphins
 Haley Bennett, actress
 Jason Bartlett, Tampa Bay Rays shortstop
 Bob Beamon, track and field athlete, gold medalist in 1968 Summer Olympics long jump, world record holder 1968 to 1991
 Liston Bochette, Olympian; Fort Myers City Council member
 Bert Blyleven, Hall of Fame pitcher for Minnesota Twins, Texas Rangers, Pittsburgh Pirates, Cleveland Indians and California Angels
 James Carlos Blake, author and former faculty member of Edison Community College
 Phillip Buchanon, cornerback for the Washington Redskins, Tampa Bay Buccaneers, Houston Texans, Oakland Raiders
 Stacy Carter, former WWE wrestler
 Stew Cliburn, Baseball player and coach. 
 Terrence Cody, nose tackle for Baltimore Ravens
 Casey Coleman, former pitcher for Chicago Cubs
 Noel Devine, running back for CFL's Montreal Alouettes
 Richard Fain, former NFL player
 Earnest Graham, NFL running back, Tampa Bay Buccaneers
 Mike Greenwell, former Boston Red Sox left fielder and NASCAR driver
 Nolan Henke, professional golfer
 Anthony Henry, cornerback, Detroit Lions, Dallas Cowboys, Cleveland Browns
 Adam Johnson, former pitcher for Minnesota Twins
 Tarah Kayne, figure skater, 2016 national champion
 Jevon Kearse, defensive end, Philadelphia Eagles, Tennessee Titans 
 Terri Kimball, Playboy Playmate of the Month for May 1964
 Derek Lamely, professional golfer
 Craig Leon, music and visual producer of the Ramones, Blondie, Luciano Pavarotti, Joshua Bell
 George McNeill, professional golfer
 Peter Mellor, English-born American footballer and coach
 Terry-Jo Myers, professional golfer, winner of three LPGA Tour tournaments
 Seth Petruzelli, professional MMA fighter
 Plies (Algernod Lanier Washington), rapper
 Lennie Rosenbluth (born 1933), college and NBA basketball player
 Deion Sanders, Hall of Fame NFL cornerback for six teams, inducted to Pro Football Hall of Fame as a Dallas Cowboy, and Major League Baseball outfielder for five teams
 Peggy Schoolcraft, professional bodybuilder, 1997 NPC Team Universe Champion
 Chad Senior, two-time Olympian (Sydney Australia, 2000 - Athens Greece, 2004), competed in pentathlon
 Vonzell Solomon, American Idol third-place finisher
 Greg Spires, former NFL player
 Elissa Steamer, professional skateboarder
 Mike Venafro, former relief pitcher for Oakland Athletics and 4 other MLB teams
 Dan Vogelbach, MLB player
 Jaylen Watkins, safety for Los Angeles Chargers 
 Sammy Watkins, wide receiver for Buffalo Bills, Los Angeles Rams, Kansas City Chiefs
 Tommy Watkins, former Minnesota Twins baseball player
Jeremy Ware, cornerback for Oakland Raiders
 Walt Wesley, professional basketball player (1966–1976) for Cincinnati Royals and six other NBA teams
 Cliff Williams, bass player for AC/DC
 Julio Zuleta, former first baseman for Chicago Cubs

Past

 Verna Aardema, children's book author
 Patty Berg, Hall of Fame golfer, one of LPGA's founders
 Gerard Damiano, adult film director
 Thomas Edison, improved and perfected the incandescent light bulb and audio recording methods, had a winter estate next to Henry Ford's
 Harvey Firestone, founded Firestone Tire Company, had a winter estate near Edison and Ford's homes
 Henry Ford, founded the Ford Motor Company, and father of the assembly line, had a winter estate next to Thomas Edison's
 Charles Ghigna, poet and children's author known as "Father Goose;" boyhood home 1950-1973
 Mario Henderson, offensive tackle, Oakland Raiders
 Sara Hildebrand, United States Olympic diver (2000, 2004)
 Jan Hooks, American actress and comedian, best known for Saturday Night Live
 Andrew Jacobson (born 1985), Major League Soccer player
 Jerry Lawler, WWE wrestler and announcer
 Clyde Lassen, U.S. Navy Commander, Medal of Honor recipient
 Denise Masino, professional bodybuilder
 Mindy McCready, country music artist
 Norma Miller, Lindy Hop dancer, choreographer, actress, author, and comedian known as the Queen of Swing
 Diamond Dallas Page, former WCW and WWE wrestler, actor
 Kimberly Page, former member of the WCW Nitro Girls and Playboy model
 Charles Rogers, Former NFL running back
 Marius Russo, professional baseball player
 Walt Wesley, professional basketball player

Sister cities
Fort Myers has a sister city agreement with:
 Gomel (Belarus)
 Santiago de los Caballeros (Dominican Republic)

Notes

Explanatory notes

Citations

General and cited sources

External links

 
 Fort Myers Economy at a Glance, U.S. Department of Labor

 
Cities in Florida
Cities in Lee County, Florida
County seats in Florida
1866 establishments in Florida
Populated places established in 1866
Second Seminole War fortifications